C23 or C-23 may refer to:

Vehicles 
Aircraft
 Beechcraft C23 Musketeer, an American civil utility aircraft
 Caspar C 23, a German sport aircraft
 Caudron C.23, a French bomber biplane
 Lockheed C-23 Altair, an American military transport
 Short C-23 Sherpa, an American military transport 

Automobiles
 Sauber C23, a Swiss Formula One car

Ships and boats
 , a C-class submarine of the Royal Navy
 Maltese patrol boat C23, involved in the C23 tragedy

Other uses 
 C2x, a proposed revision of the C programming language
 C-23 (card game), a collectible card game by Wizards of the Coast
 C23 road (Namibia)
 Bishop's Opening, a chess opening
 Caldwell 23, a spiral galaxy
 Gallbladder cancer

See also 
 List of compounds with carbon number 23